Huang Shaohong (1895 – August 31, 1966) was a warlord in Guangxi province and governed Guangxi as part of the New Guangxi Clique through the latter part of the Warlord era, and a leader in later years of the Republic of China.

Biography
Huang was born in 1895 in Rong County, Guangxi, China. After the 1911 revolution he attended Guangxi Military Cadre Training School in Guilin along with Bai Chongxi and Li Zongren. Later he rose to command the Model Battalion, a modern professional military formation equipped with machine guns.

In the confused power struggles following the Ao-Gui Wars, local military figures began to carve out territory in Guangxi and dominate it. In the southwest were the opium trails from both Yunnan and Guizhou that ran through Baise and then down the river to Nanning, from whence opium usually went out through Wuzhou, where the trade was financed. 
 
During the Ao-Gui wars Huang, then the commander of the Model Battalion, attempted to stay neutral and relocated to Baise in the far northwest. By stages he came to control Baise, and with it the opium trade. Later he expanded his control to Wuzhou, thus locking up the portals through which opium both entered and left Guangxi. By the spring of 1924 the new Guangxi Clique had formed and created the Guangxi Pacification Army. Li Zongren was the Commander-in-Chief, Huang the deputy Commander and Bai Chongxi the Chief of Staff. By August they had defeated and driven former ruler Lu Rongting and other contenders out of the province and Huang became the civil governor of Guangxi from 1924-29. He was also interior and transportation minister in the National Government of Chiang Kai-shek after 1927.

During the Kumul Rebellion Chiang Kai-shek was ready to send Huang and his expeditionary force, which he assembled to assist Muslim Gen. Ma Zhongying against Sheng Shicai, but when Chiang heard about the Soviet Invasion of Xinjiang, he decided to withdraw to avoid an international incident if his troops directly engaged the Soviets, leaving Ma alone without reinforcements to fight the Red Army.

Huang became chairman of the government of Zhejiang from 1934–35 and Hubei from 1936-37. Again from 1937-46 he became chairman of the government of Zhejiang and commander of the 15th Army of the National Revolutionary Army. During World War II he was named deputy commander-in-chief of the 2nd War Zone. After the war he was named head of the Supervisory Committee and elected member of the Legislative Yuan (parliament).

During the Chinese Civil War peace talks in March 1949, he was one of the Kuomintang delegates. He and Zhang Zhizhong agreed to accept the cease-fire conditions submitted by the Communist Party. When the Kuomintang leadership turned them down later, Huang fled to Hong Kong and declared his revolt from the KMT and joined the Chinese People's Political Consultative Conference (CPPCC) in September 1949.

After the founding of the People's Republic, Huang was elected a member of the State Council, National People's Congress, and CPPCC. He was also a member of the Standing Committee of the Kuomintang Revolutionary Committee. During the Anti-Rightist Movement, Huang was labeled a rightist. Later, during the Cultural Revolution, he was again determined to be a "rightist." Unable to stand the persecution of the Red Guards, he committed suicide at home on August 31, 1966, in Beijing.

References

Citations

Sources 

 Huang Shaohong (with photo)
 (rulers of) Administrative Divisions, China
 THE ZHUANG AND THE 1911 REVOLUTION

1895 births
1966 deaths
People from Yulin, Guangxi
Baoding Military Academy cadets
Republic of China warlords from Guangxi
Hakka people
Hakka generals
National Revolutionary Army generals
Chinese military personnel of World War II
Delegates to the 1st National People's Congress
Members of the 3rd Chinese People's Political Consultative Conference
Members of the 2nd Chinese People's Political Consultative Conference
Members of the 1st Chinese People's Political Consultative Conference
Members of the Revolutionary Committee of the Chinese Kuomintang
Members of the Control Yuan
People's Republic of China politicians from Guangxi
Suicides during the Cultural Revolution
Members of the Kuomintang
Chinese politicians who committed suicide
Interior Ministers of the Republic of China
Transportation Ministers of the Republic of China
Victims of the Anti-Rightist Campaign
Members of the 1st Legislative Yuan